KELT-2A (also called KELT-2, HD 42176, or HD 42176A) is a yellow white main sequence star located about 439 light-years away in the constellation Auriga. The apparent magnitude of this star is 8.77, which means it is not visible to the naked eye but can be seen with a binoculars.

KELT-2A is the brightest star in the common-proper-motion binary star system KELT-2 (HD 42176). KELT-2B is an early K dwarf approximately 295 AU away, which was discovered simultaneously with the planet KELT-2Ab.

Planetary system
This star has one known planet, the extrasolar planet KELT-2Ab.

See also
 KELT

References

External links
 KELT-North survey website 
 

Auriga (constellation)
F-type main-sequence stars
Planetary systems with one confirmed planet
Planetary transit variables
J06103935+3057258
42176
Durchmusterung objects
29301
TIC objects
Binary stars
K-type main-sequence stars